Robert W. Nulf (May 13, 1906 – June 1985) was an American football and basketball coach.

Coaching career
Nulf was the head football coach at Kalamazoo College in Kalamazoo, Michigan.  He held that position for four seasons, from 1942 until 1948. His coaching record at Kalamazoo was 18–10–4.  Kalamazoo did not field a football team from 1943 to 1945.

Head coaching record

Football

References

External links
 

1906 births
1985 deaths
Kalamazoo Hornets athletic directors
Kalamazoo Hornets football coaches
Kalamazoo Hornets men's basketball coaches
Butler University alumni
University of Illinois alumni